Kryptopyga is a genus of hoverfly native to Java, containing two species.

Species
K. pendulosa Hull, 1944
K. sulawesiana Reemer, 2013

References

Diptera of Asia
Insects of Indonesia
Endemic fauna of Indonesia
Microdontinae
Hoverfly genera